Athletic may refer to:
 An athlete, a sportsperson
 Athletic director, a position at many American universities and schools
 Athletic type, a physical/psychological type in the classification of Ernst Kretschmer
 Athletic of Philadelphia, a baseball team of the 1870s

Football clubs
 Annan Athletic F.C., a Scottish football club
 Alloa Athletic F.C., a Scottish football club
 Athletic Club, a Spanish football club based in Bilbao
 Athletic Club Femenino, women's team of the above
 Bilbao Athletic, men's reserve team of the above
 Athletic Club Ajaccio, a French football club.
 Athletic FC, a Swedish football club
Athletico SC, a Lebanese association football academy
Athletico SC Women, women's team of the above
 Atlético Madrid, a Spanish football club
 Charlton Athletic F.C., an English football club
 Carshalton Athletic F.C., an English football club
 AFC Croydon Athletic, an English football club
 Dunfermline Athletic F.C., a Scottish football club
 Forfar Athletic F.C., a Scottish football club
 Oldham Athletic A.F.C., an English football club
 Senglea Athletic F.C., a Maltese football club
 Wigan Athletic F.C., an English football club

See also
Athlete (disambiguation)
Athletic club (disambiguation)
 Athletic Park, Wellington, New Zealand, a former sports ground mainly used for rugby union
Athletics (disambiguation)
The Athletic, sports website
Atlético (disambiguation)